also known by  and his Chinese style name , was a bureaucrat of the Ryukyu Kingdom. He served as a member of sanshikan from 1782 to 1801.

In 1775, he and Kōchi Ryōtoku was ordered to make the first statutory law in Ryukyuan history by King Shō Boku. The law was completed in 1786. and was jointly signed by Ie and his two colleges, Yonabaru Ryōku and Fukuyama Chōki. Later, it was officially promulgated and implemented by the king in the same year.

The mountain forests in Nakagami and Kunigami were withered. Ie was sent there to deal with it. He managed to propagate them by cutting off withered trees and planting trees in a reasonable method.

Ie's diary, Ie Ueekata Hinikki, was a very important history record.

References

1731 births
Sanshikan
People of the Ryukyu Kingdom
Ryukyuan people
18th-century Ryukyuan people
19th-century Ryukyuan people
Year of death missing